Tingika Elikana (born 5 November 1961) is a Cook Islands civil servant and politician and member of the Cook Islands Parliament. He is a member of the Cook Islands Party.

Elikana was born on Pukapuka and educated at Pukapuka School and Tereora College. He studied law at Victoria University of Wellington in New Zealand and then a Masters of Business Administration at the University of the South Pacific as well as public sector management at Massey University. He worked as a police officer, and then as a crown prosecutor, Deputy Solicitor General, and Solicitor General. From 2011 to 2018 he was Secretary for Justice.

He was elected to Parliament at the 2018 Cook Islands general election. After his election, the government charted a special flight at a cost of $32,000 to collect him from the outer islands. The flight was later the subject of a private prosecution launched against Prime Minister Henry Puna by former MP Norman George. As an MP, Elikana chaired the select committee which decided that homosexuality should remain a criminal offence in the Cook Islands. In February 2020 he was accused of orchestrating the sacking of six public servants who belonged to the opposition Democratic Party. Following the election of Mark Brown as Prime Minister he was appointed Associate Minister of Justice, Finance and Economic Management, Foreign Affairs and Immigration. On 22 March 2021 he was elected Deputy Speaker, replacing Tai Tura.

He was re-elected at the 2022 Cook Islands general election.

References

Living people
1961 births
Victoria University of Wellington alumni
University of the South Pacific alumni
Massey University alumni
Cook Island police officers
Cook Island lawyers
Cook Island civil servants
Members of the Parliament of the Cook Islands
Cook Islands Party politicians